Prakash Babanna Hukkeri is a Member of Karnataka Legislative Council from North-West Teachers Constituency. He got elected in June 2022, also he was a Member of Parliament in the Lok Sabha (2014-19) representing Chikkodi constituency for the Congress Party. He is a State Vice President of the Indian National Congress Karnataka. He was a member of the Karnataka Legislative Assembly, the minister for Small scale Industries, Sugar and Endowments and the minister in charge for Haveri District in the Government of Karnataka.

Karnataka Legislative Assembly election, 2013
He was elected to Karnataka Legislative Assembly in the 2013 election from Chikkodi-Sadalga constituency with 1,02,237 votes. He also won in 2008 assembly elections from the same constituency.

References

Indian National Congress politicians from Karnataka
Living people
Karnataka MLAs 2008–2013
India MPs 2014–2019
People from Belagavi district
Lok Sabha members from Karnataka
1947 births